Tetrathemis corduliformis is a species of dragonfly in the family Libellulidae. It is found in the Democratic Republic of the Congo, Kenya, and Uganda. Its natural habitat is subtropical or tropical moist lowland forests.

References

Libellulidae
Taxonomy articles created by Polbot
Insects described in 1936